G.S. Sohan Singh (August 1914 – 28 February 1999) was a Punjabi artist. He was the son of Punjabi artist Gian Singh Naqqash and an apprentice of Hari Singh. He painted hundreds of portraits of famous Sikh personalities which includes portraits Guru Ram Das, Guru Nanak Dev, Jassa Singh Ramgarhia and Bhai Kanhaiya.

Biography 
Sohan Singh was born in August 1914 in Amritsar, British Punjab (now Punjab, India).

Books 

 Gian Chitravali: Masterpieces of the Late Bhai Gian Singh Naqqash (1956)
 Revealing the Art of G.S. Sohan Singh(1971)

References 

1914 births
1999 deaths
Male artists from Punjab, India